Smash Into Pieces are a Swedish rock musical group formed in 2008 in Örebro.

History 

The band was formed in 2008 by members Benjamin Jennebo, Per Bergquist, Isak Snow, Viktor Vidlund and Chris Adam Hedman Sörbye. They released their first single, "Fading" in 2009, the song peaked number 33 in the Swedish singles chart. In 2012 they signed a contract with Gain Music Entertainment which is a part of Sony Music Entertainment. A few months later, during the "Bandit Rock Awards" they receive the award for "Band Revelation of the Year". Their debut album, Unbreakable, was released on April 10, 2013, the album peaked number 7 in the Swedish singles chart. The album was followed by a European tour first alongside Amaranthe and Deals Death, and later alongside Alter Bridge and Halestorm.

On 25 February 2015, their second album, The Apocalypse DJ was released, preceded by the single "Checkmate". During 2015 the singles "Stronger" and "Color of Your Eyes" were released. After the second album was out, Isak Snow left the band.
On 6 January 2016, they released the single "Merry Go Round", in anticipation of the third studio album. That album, titled Rise and Shine, was released on 27 January 2017. In this album, the main singles were "Higher" and "Boomerang". Following the release of the third album, one of the members, Viktor Vidlund left the band. Only one year after the release of Rise and Shine, on 12 October 2018, the band's fourth album, Evolver, was released.

On 30 November 2022, it was announced that Smash Into Pieces would compete in Melodifestivalen 2023 with the song "Six Feet Under". They participated in the fourth heat of the competition on 25 February 2023. They came in second place in the heat, allowing them to progress to the final on 11 March 2023. The song was released on digital platforms that same evening. The song peaked at number 4 in the Swedish singles chart.

Members

Current members 
 Chris Adam Hedman Sörbye – vocals
 Benjmain Jennebo – guitar
 The Apocalypse DJ – drums
 Per Bergquist – guitar

Past members 
 Isak Snow – drums
 Viktor Vidlund – bass

Discography

Extended plays
 2021 – VR

Studio albums 
 2013 – Unbreakable
 2015 – The Apocalypse DJ
 2017 – Rise and Shine
 2018 – Evolver
 2020 – Arcadia
 2021 – A New Horizon
 2022 – Disconnect

Singles 
 2009 – "Fading"
 2012 – "I Want You to Know"
 2013 – "Colder"
 2013 – "A Friend Like You"
 2013 – "Unbreakable"
 2014 – "Disaster Highway"
 2015 – "Checkmate"
 2016 – "Merry Go Round"
 2016 – "Let Me Be Your Superhero"
 2016 – "Higher"
 2017 – "Yolo"
 2017 – "Radioactive Mother (Lover)"
 2017 – "Boomerang"
 2018 – "Superstar in Me"
 2018 – "Ride with U"
 2018 – "In Need of Medicine"
 2018 – "Like This!"
 2019 – "Human"
 2019 – "Arcadia"
 2019 – "Ego"
 2020 – "Mad World"
 2020 – "Godsent"
 2020 – "All Eyes on You"
 2020 – "Everything They S4Y"
 2020 – "Higher" (Zardonic Remix)
 2020 – "Big Bang"
 2020 – "Big Bang" (Zardonic Remix)
 2020 – "Counting on Me" (Acoustic)
 2020 – "Boomerang" (Zardonic Remix)
 2020 – "Let Me Be Your Superhero" (Acoustic)
 2020 – "Save It for the Living" (Acoustic)
 2021 – "Come Along" (Acoustic)
 2021 – "Arcadia" (Jerome Remix)
 2021 – "Rise Up"
 2021 – "Wake Up" (Gaming Remix ft. APOC)
 2021 – "Real One"
 2021 – "Counting on Me"
 2021 – "Broken Parts"
 2021 – "All Eyes on You" (Acoustic version)
 2021 – "Cut You Off"
 2021 – "Glow in the Dark"
 2021 – "The Rain"
 2021 – "Not Waiting for Heaven"
 2022 – "Deadman"
 2022 – "Vanguard"
 2022 – "A Shot in the Dark"
 2022 – "Heathens"
 2022 – "Freight Train"
 2022 – "Sleepwalking"
 2023 – "Six Feet Under"

References 

Swedish rock music groups
Swedish musical groups
2008 establishments in Sweden
Musical groups established in 2008
Melodifestivalen contestants of 2023